List of Ministers of Defence of the Republic of Cyprus since the independence in 1960:

References

Defence
Cyprus Ministers of Defence